Steven Chen or Steve Chen, may refer to:

 Steve Chen (born 1978), Taiwanese-born American Internet entrepreneur
 Steven Chen (musician), member of The Airborne Toxic Event
 Chen Shyh-kwei or Steven Chen (born 1952), Taiwanese politician, Governor of Fujian Province of the Republic of China in 2013
 Steve Chen (computer engineer) (born 1944), Taiwanese computer engineer
 Steve Chen (politician) (born 1948), Taiwanese politician, Minister of Economic Affairs from 2006 to 2008
 Stephen S.F. Chen (born 1934), Taiwanese diplomat